Sea rescue may refer to:
 Air-sea rescue
 Maritime search and rescue
 Sea Rescue (TV program), a children's show on US television 2012–2018

See also
 Sea rescue in Australia
 :Category:Sea rescue in the United Kingdom

Sea rescue